"Text Me Merry Christmas" is a song performed by Straight No Chaser and Kristen Bell.  It was written by Adam Schlesinger and David Javerbaum. The song was released on November 17, 2014.

Lyrics
Written to convey "how informal communication has become", the group picked Bell immediately upon deciding the song should be a duet.  Bell found it "a blast" to perform in the a cappella style.  Bell's male counterpart is Michael Luginbill. The song touches on a common theme for Christmas music, that of being apart.

Reception
Upon release, Billboard called the tune both "catchy" and "goofy". Within three days of its release, the official YouTube video had garnered 1.7 million views. The song reached number 56 on the Billboard Holiday 100 on December 19, 2014.

Charts

References

American Christmas songs
Songs written by Adam Schlesinger
2014 songs
Kristen Bell songs